Tamara Seda (born Oct 18, 1998) is a Mozambican basketball player. She plays professionally for Kutaxabank Araski women team and also Mozambique women's national basketball team

College
Seda graduated from The University of Texas At El Paso Miners, but pior to UTEP she was a student of Seward County Community College where she averaged 14.2 points per game, 9.8 rebounds per game and 26 assists.

In her sophomore year at UTEP, she appeared in 34 games, including two starts, she had 4.1 points per game and 4.4 rebounds per game.
As a junior she averaged 9.6 points, 9.0 rebounds and 1.6 blocks. Also in her senior year she had 15 double-doubles, 14.9 points per game and 9.6 rebounds per game.

National Team Career
Seda participated in the 2017 FIBA Women's Afrobasket with her mozambican team mates and averaged 9.3 points per game, 8.6 rebounds per game, and 0.3 assists.
And also 2019 and 2021: FIBA Women's Afrobasket. She averaged 10.6 points per game,11.4 rebounds,1 assist and 8.8 points per game, 8.7 rebounds per game and 1.8 assists respectively.

References

Living people
1994 births
Mozambican women's basketball players
University of Texas at El Paso alumni